Flexner is a surname. Notable people with the surname include:

Abraham Flexner (1866–1959), American educator, author of the Flexner Report
Bernard Flexner (1882–1946), New York lawyer, prominent member of the Zionist Organization of America
Eleanor Flexner (1908–1995), independent scholar and pioneer in the field of women's studies
James Thomas Flexner (1908–2003), prolific writer on American art history, wrote a four-volume biography of George Washington
Jennie Maas Flexner (1882–1944), librarian and author
Simon Flexner (1863–1946), physician, scientist, administrator, and professor of experimental pathology at the University of Pennsylvania
Stuart Berg Flexner (1928–1990), lexicographer, editor and author, noted for his books on the origins of American words and expressions

See also
Boies, Schiller & Flexner, American law firm founded by David Boies and Jonathan D. Schiller in 1997
Flexner Report, book-length study of medical education in the United States and Canada written by Abraham Flexner, published in 1910
Flexner-Wintersteiner rosette, a spoke and wheel shaped cell formation seen in retinoblastoma and certain other ophthalmic tumors